Pollia japonica, known as East Asian pollia in English, yabumyoga in Japanese, and dùruò in Chinese, is a perennial flower native to East Asia. Its niche is forests 0–1200 m.  It is native in Anhui, Fujian, Guangdong, Guangxi, Guizhou, Hubei, Hunan, Jiangxi, and Sichuan Provinces of China.  It is also found in Taiwan, Japan, and Korea.

References 

Commelinaceae
Flora of China
Flora of Eastern Asia
Plants described in 1781